St. Brendan's Rugby Club, or St. Brendan's, is an Argentine rugby union and field hockey club located in the city of Fátima, Buenos Aires. The rugby union team currently plays in the Torneo de la URBA Grupo II, the second division of the Unión de Rugby de Buenos Aires league system.

References

External links
 Official Facebook

Rugby clubs established in 2004
s
s
2004 establishments in Argentina